The Infant Saint John the Baptist is a c.1521 oil on panel painting by Rosso Fiorentino, now in a private collection in Florence. Stylistically close to the artist's Volterra Deposition, its nervy contour lines and gaunt brushstrokes are also similar to his Holy Family with the Infant Saint John the Baptist (Walters Art Museum).

References

Paintings depicting John the Baptist
1521 paintings
Paintings by Rosso Fiorentino
Paintings in Florence